William Negri (30 July 1935 – 26 June 2020) was an Italian association football manager and footballer who played as a goalkeeper. He represented the Italy national football team 12 times, the first being on 11 November 1962, on the occasion of a friendly match against Austria in a 2–1 away win.

On 26 June 2020, Negri died in Mantua at the age of 84.

References

1935 births
2020 deaths
Italian footballers
Italy international footballers
Association football goalkeepers
Mantova 1911 players
Palermo F.C. players
Bologna F.C. 1909 players
L.R. Vicenza players
Genoa C.F.C. players
Mantova 1911 managers
Italian football managers